Gregory A. Smith (born November 24, 1987), known professionally as Kid Fury, is an American YouTube vlogger, comedian, and writer. He is best known as the co-host of podcast The Read, with Crissle West.

Early life
Kid Fury was born and raised in Miami, Florida, where his parents emigrated from Jamaica. He has two younger brothers. He enjoyed comedy from a young age and especially liked In Living Color, Martin and Moesha.

Career

YouTube vlogs 
Kid Fury launched a YouTube channel in 2010 where he hosted a vlog series called Furious Thoughts. At the time of the launch he also had a comedy blog and created the YouTube account to drive traffic to his blog. His videos featured comedic, unfiltered takes on pop culture and his real life and attracted a large, diverse audience. The New York Observer called him "Black Twitter's Kingmaker", and Ebony'''s Jamilah Lemieux compared him to Eddie Murphy.

Kid Fury moved to New York City in 2012. As of July 2013, his videos had over 10 million views. In 2016, he told NBC: "As a person of color and gay man, it is three times as hard to get opportunities in this industry, so I am doing my best to create my own...I'm building my business instead of waiting for others to give me the keys."

The Read

In 2011, Kid Fury met future collaborator Crissle West, who later moved to New York City in 2013. Chris Morrow approached Fury about doing a podcast with Morrow's then-startup podcasting company, the Loud Speakers Network. Fury asked West to join him and they named the podcast The Read. , The Read was averaging 400,000 listeners per episode. In 2019, the podcast's television adaptation, The Read with Kid Fury and Crissle West, premiered on Fuse.

 Television work 
In 2016, Kid Fury put on a live version of his show that consisted largely of stand-up comedy, called "Furious Thoughts Live". He also appeared as a supporting character in the second season of Dear White People.

In July 2018, it was announced that Kid Fury was developing a television show for HBO with executive producer Lena Waithe. The project is described as a "surreal dark comedy" that will follow a gay Black man in his twenties, navigating life in New York City with depression. Kid Fury met producer Chloe Pisello of Avalon Television, who enjoyed the pitch and helped him shop the show around to several networks. Eventually, they signed a deal with HBO.

Kid Fury is a staff writer for the Miami-set HBO Max series Rap Sh!t.

Personal life
Fury is openly gay. In an interview with HuffPost, he stated, "I want people to understand that being black and gay is so different than just being gay...Black women get overlooked in the fight for women all of the time, so there's I think a similar thing that happens in the gay community with black gays."

He is noted for advocating for Missy Elliott to receive MTV's VMA Video Vanguard Award on The Read''. Elliott received the award in 2019 and thanked Kid Fury and West for drumming up support during her acceptance speech.

Accolades

References

External links
 
 

Living people
American podcasters
LGBT people from Florida
1987 births
American radio personalities
American people of Jamaican descent
Gay comedians
Video bloggers
Entertainers from Florida
Jamaican screenwriters
American gay writers
21st-century American screenwriters
LGBT YouTubers
20th-century LGBT people
21st-century LGBT people